Passader See is a lake in Eastern Schleswig-Holstein, Germany. At an elevation of 18,8 m, its surface area is 2.7 km².

External links 
 

Lakes of Schleswig-Holstein
LPassaderSee